Chalbury Hillfort is an Iron Age hillfort about  south-east of the village of Bincombe, in Dorset, England. It is a scheduled monument.

Description

The hill is an outcrop of the Dorset Ridgeway.

There is a gap entrance in the south-east.

There are medieval strip lynchets surrounding the fort, and running into the rampart on the north side.

There are many circular depressions within the enclosure, and at least 20 are probably contemporary storage pits. Around the perimeter are at least 30 platforms, which are thought to be huts.

There is an interior quarry ditch behind the rampart north of the entrance, from which material was used to construct the fort.

The site was excavated by Miss M. Whitley in 1939. The rampart was found to have limestone revetments. Apart from a few finds of the late Bronze Age and the Romano-British period, most of the finds showed two phases of occupation in the early Iron Age.

See also
 Hillforts in Britain

References

Hill forts in Dorset
Scheduled monuments in Dorset